The 1893 Stanford football team represented Stanford University in the 1893 college football season. Led by C. D. Bliss, Stanford was undefeated, with one tie against rival California.

Season summary
The previous season, Stanford was coached by Walter Camp, who had agreed to coach the team on the condition that he complete coaching Yale's football season first. For the 1893 season, Camp returned to the East Coast and Stanford hired C. D. "Pop" Bliss, who had played halfback for Camp's team at Yale and had just graduated. Led by Bliss, Stanford dominated its opponents, outscoring them 284–17 with seven shutouts and only one blemish: a tie with rival California.

This was Bliss's only season at Stanford; Camp returned to Stanford the next season and Bliss moved on to coach Haverford College.

Schedule

References

Stanford
Stanford Cardinal football seasons
Stanford football